Enchanted Piano is the ninth studio album from American new-age pianist Kevin Kern, and his tenth overall (excluding territory-exclusive albums). As with his preceding and succeeding albums, it is an album of instrumental songs. It was released on January 17, 2012.

Unlike Kern's past albums, this album breaks away from his other in the way that it is recorded solely on the piano; as such, there are no other instruments whatsoever on the album. In addition to this, these songs are re-recorded versions of past Kern compositions that appeared on his previous albums; none of the songs here are new.

None of the songs from In My Life (1999), The Winding Path (2003), or Endless Blue Sky (2009) were re-recorded for this album.

Track listing
All compositions by Kevin Kern.

Personnel 
 Kevin Kern – Steinway piano, producer, composer, arrangement
 Terence Yallop – executive producer

References

External links 
 
 Kevin Kern at Real Music

Enchanted Piano
Kevin Kern albums